Diaphone is a genus of moths of the family Noctuidae.

Species
 Diaphone angolensis Weymer, 1901
 Diaphone delamarei Viette, 1962
 Diaphone eumela (Stoll, [1782])
 Diaphone lampra Karsch, 1894
 Diaphone mossambicensis Hopffer, 1862
 Diaphone niveiplaga Carcasson, 1965
 Diaphone rungsi Laporte, 1973

References
Natural History Museum Lepidoptera genus database
Diaphone at funet

Glottulinae